is a feminine Japanese given name and is occasionally used as a surname.

Possible writings
Emi can be written using different kanji characters and can mean:
as a given name
 , "blessing, beauty"
 , "picture, beauty"
 , "reflect, look"
 , "reflect, beauty"
 , "smile"
 ,  "prosperous, beauty"
 ,  "blessing, not yet"
 ,  "blessing, fruit"
 , "wisdom, beauty" 

The given name can also be written in hiragana or katakana.
as a surname
 , "bay, look"
 , "bay, beauty"

People with the name
 , US based Japanese visual artist, emi-arts.com
 , Japanese hurdler
 , Japanese singer
 , Japanese comedian and stage actress
 , Japanese urban music singer-songwriter
 , Japanese softball player
 , Japanese politician
 , Japanese skier
 , Japanese gravure idol
 , Japanese actress
 Emi Lo (born 1991), non-binary Taiwanese-Chinese-American voice actor
 , Japanese javelin thrower
 Emi Morimoto (born 1981), Japanese drummer
 , Japanese voice actress
 , Japanese professional wrestler
 , Japanese women's footballer
 , Japanese voice actress and singer
 , Japanese ice hockey player
 , Japanese curler
 , Japanese voice actress
 , Chinese-Japanese actress and fashion model
 , Japanese singer
 , Japanese voice actress
 , Japanese costume designer
 , Japanese actress
 , Japanese figure skater
 , Japanese women's footballer

Fictional characters
 , a character in the Tenjho Tenge series
 , a character in the visual novel Katawa Shoujo
 Emi Yusa, a character in the anime and manga The Devil is a Part-Timer! 
 Emi Igawa, a character in the anime and manga Your Lie In April
 Emi Toshiba, a background character in Konami's Dance Dance Revolution dance game series

See also
 Mimasaka-Emi Station, a train station in Mimasaka, Okayama Prefecture, Japan
 Magical Star Magical Emi, a magical girl anime series

Japanese feminine given names